Callisto insperatella is a moth of the family Gracillariidae. It is found from Fennoscandia to Switzerland, Austria, and Ukraine.

The larvae feed on Prunus cerasus and Prunus padus. They mine the leaves of their host plant. The mine starts as an epidermal gallery with a central frass line. The gallery widens into a blotch and the larva starts consuming the parenchyma. In the end, the mine has the form of a lower-surface tentiform mine. It is strongly contracted, but without folds. The larva vacates the mine by an opening in the lower epidermis and lives freely in a leaf margin that has been folded downwards. Within this fold, the larva starts feeding in the apical section, working downwards. The frass is deposited in the oldest part of the fold. During feeding pauses, the larva rests still untouched central part of the fold. After the first fold has been eaten out, a second one is made.

References

Gracillariinae
Moths of Europe
Moths described in 1864